Jeannette Runciman Island is an island in the Thousand Islands archipelago, within the United Counties of Leeds and Grenville in Ontario, Canada. It was named in honour of Jeannette Runciman, the spouse of retired Canadian politician Bob Runciman. Jeannette Runciman was killed in 2020 when she was struck by a small SUV in the parking lot of Brockville General Hospital in Brockville, Ontario.

References

External links

Landforms of Leeds and Grenville United Counties
Islands of the Thousand Islands in Ontario